Lawrenceville is a city in and the county seat of Lawrence County, Illinois, United States, located along the Embarras River. The population was 4,348 at the 2010 census. Lawrenceville is located in southeast Illinois, northwest of Vincennes, Indiana.

The city is home of the Lawrenceville "Indians", Illinois Class A high school state basketball champions in 1972, 1974, 1982 and 1983. The team had a combined two season win–loss record of 68-0 from 1982–83.  The team was coached by Ron Felling, who, after the 1983 season at Lawrenceville, went on to coach at Indiana University as an assistant under Bobby Knight.

Geography

Demographics

As of the census of 2000, there were 4,745 people, 2,024 households, and 1,190 families residing in the city. The racial makeup of the city was 97.85% White, 0.91% African American, 0.08% Native American, 0.23% Asian, 0.40% from other races, and 0.53% from two or more races. Hispanic or Latino of any race were 1.43% of the population.

There were 2,024 households, out of which 24.5% had children under the age of 18 living with them, 45.6% were married couples living together, 10.5% had a female householder with no husband present, and 41.2% were non-families. 37.4% of all households were made up of individuals, and 20.6% had someone living alone who was 65 years of age or older. The average household size was 2.16 and the average family size was 2.82.

In the city the population was spread out, with 20.0% under the age of 18, 7.4% from 18 to 24, 23.7% from 25 to 44, 20.7% from 45 to 64, and 28.2% who were 65 years of age or older. The median age was 44 years. For every 100 females, there were 78.0 males. For every 100 females age 18 and over, there were 74.4 males.

The median income for a household in the city was $24,951, and the median income for a family was $32,042. Males had a median income of $27,128 versus $20,451 for females. The per capita income for the city was $16,717. About 13.9% of families and 16.9% of the population were below the poverty line, including 28.7% of those under age 18 and 9.0% of those age 65 or over.

Notable people 

 George C. Armstrong, Illinois state senator, mayor of Lawrenceville, and newspaper editor
 Philip B. Benefiel, Illinois state senator, lawyer, and judge
 Mordecai Brown, Hall of Fame pitcher for Chicago Cubs and St. Louis Cardinals; previously lived in Lawrenceville and played corporate ball for the Texaco Havolines
 Garrel Burgoon, Illinois state representative and businessman
 Frances Crane, mystery author; born in Lawrenceville
 Lyman W. Emmons (1885–1955), American businessman and politician
 Herschella Horton, Arizona state representative
 Lyle Judy, second baseman for the St. Louis Cardinals; born in Lawrenceville
 William McAndrew, football and basketball coach
 Jason Pargin, known by his pen name David Wong is an American comedy and horror writer.
 Jack Ryan, MLB pitcher for the Cleveland Naps, Boston Red Sox and Brooklyn Dodgers
 Marty Simmons, current head men’s basketball coach at Eastern Illinois University; born and raised in Lawrenceville
 Maurice Cole Tanquary A professor of entomology and member of the Crocker Land Expedition.

References

External links
 City website
 Daily Record
 City Data website
 Community Unit School District website
 Southeastern Illinois CVB – Tourism Website of area

Cities in Lawrence County, Illinois
County seats in Illinois
Cities in Illinois